The 1976 United States Senate election in Wyoming took place on November 2, 1976. Incumbent Democratic Senator Gale W. McGee ran for re-election to his fourth term. Following a close win in his first race in 1958, McGee won wider victories in 1964 and 1970, even as the state's electorate grew more conservative. In 1976, McGee faced a strong challenge from State Senator Malcolm Wallop, the Republican nominee. Despite McGee's past victories in the state, he faced considerable headwinds as President Gerald Ford won the state over Jimmy Carter convincingly, even as Ford was losing nationwide. In the end, despite McGee's ability to significantly outperform other Democratic candidates, he was unable to defeat Wallop, and lost re-election by a fairly wide margin, winning just 45% of the vote to Wallop's 55%.

Democratic primary

Candidates
 Gale W. McGee, incumbent U.S. Senator

Results

Republican Primary

Candidates
 Malcolm Wallop, State Senator, 1974 Republican candidate for Governor
 Nels T. Larson 
 Doyle Henry, perennial candidate

Results

General election

Results

References

1976
Wyoming
1976 Wyoming elections